Abraham Forsythe (born 26 July 1981) is an Australian film and television actor, director, writer and producer. He is the son of actor and comedian Drew Forsythe.

Career
He first appeared on the TV series The Miraculous Mellops. He has since appeared as Campbell Todd on the Australian TV series Always Greener, starred in the mini-series Marking Time and starred and directed the 2003 film Ned. He also directed and starred in a parody of The Matrix called Computer Boy. He also starred in the Australian/British television series co-production Tripping Over.

Forsythe has also guest starred in several Australian TV shows, including Blue Heelers, All Saints, Water Rats and Blue Water High.

In 2009, Forsythe wrote and directed the Tropfest short Being Carl Williams. The short won second prize and the Best Comedy award. The 2010 Tropfest saw him win first prize with Shock, a short tribute to radio personality Kyle Sandilands.

In 2012 he played a lead role in one of Australia's most popular TV mini-series ever. Forsythe played John Cornell in the Australian drama Howzat! Kerry Packer's War which was based on Packer's takeover of cricket in 1977, and the establishment of World Series Cricket. Along with directing the second series of Laid (TV series).

In 2016 he wrote and directed the controversial 2005 Cronulla riots inspired black comedy Down Under. Followed in 2019 by Little Monsters a horror/comedy starring Lupita Nyong'o and Josh Gad, which premiered at the Sundance Film Festival.

In November 2019, he was confirmed to direct the next installment of the RoboCop franchise, titled RoboCop Returns.

Personal life
Forsythe was married to actress Helen Dallimore. They separated in 2013.

Filmography
Short film

Feature film

Television

Acting roles

References

External links
 

1981 births
Living people
AACTA Award winners
Australian male television actors
Australian television directors
Australian television writers
Australian male film actors
Australian film directors
Australian screenwriters
People educated at Newtown High School of the Performing Arts
Australian male television writers